Stuart Storer (born 16 January 1967) is a footballer, who played as a defender and is manager of Bedworth United.
Stuart Storer has legendary status amongst Brighton and Hove Albion supporters. His pace and crosses from the right wing helped keep the club in the Football League in 1996-1997 season. Crucially he scored the last goal at the Goldstone Ground in a vital 1-0 win against Doncaster Rovers.

Career
At the age of 40 Storer was a member of Hinckley United team that achieved their highest ever league position of fourth in the Conference North, qualifying for the play-offs, then reaching the play-off final, only to lose 4–3 on penalties.

Storer moved off the pitch at Hinckley United, and became part of the coaching staff. Beginning as first team coach, and then for the 2010–11 season became assistant manager. Storer reverted to first team coach in July 2011, and Mark Faulkner was brought in as assistant manager in August 2011. On 21 May 2013 Carl Heggs resigned as manager of Hinckley United and Stuart Storer was offered the chance to take over as manager. On 27 May, Stuart accepted the offer to become the new manager of Hinckley United but the club was closed down in October that year. He was appointed manager of Bedworth United on 5 December 2013.

Honours
Sherpa Van Trophy winner 1989
Southern League Midlands/West Division Championship 2000–01

References

External links

Stuart Storer's player profile at Hinckley Independent Website

1967 births
Living people
Association football defenders
Mansfield Town F.C. players
Birmingham City F.C. players
Everton F.C. players
Wigan Athletic F.C. players
Bolton Wanderers F.C. players
Exeter City F.C. players
Brighton & Hove Albion F.C. players
Atherstone Town F.C. players
Kettering Town F.C. players
Chesham United F.C. players
Hinckley United F.C. players
English footballers
Bedworth United F.C. players
Rugby Town F.C. players
English football managers
Hinckley United F.C. managers
Bedworth United F.C. managers
Sportspeople from Rugby, Warwickshire